A twin-stick shooter is a subgenre of shoot 'em up video games. It is a multidirectional shooter in which the player character is controlled using two joysticks: one for movement on a flat plane, and one to aim and fire shots at enemies, Usually shots are fired as soon as the second joystick is moved, but in some games there is an additional button which must be held. Keyboard and mouse or touch input can supplant one or both of the joysticks when an arcade machine or controller is not used. Virtual joysticks can be used when a game is played on a touch screen. 

This control scheme was used in arcade games starting with Gun Fight in 1975, but came into prominence with the high-action Robotron: 2084 in 1982. The ubiquity of gamepads with two thumb-controlled sticks overcame the difficulty of playing twin-stick shooters at home and eventually  led to a resurgence of the genre following the release of Geometry Wars: Retro Evolved in 2005.

History 
The 1975 arcade video game Gun Fight (released as Western Gun in Japan) uses one joystick for movement and a second for firing. Each joystick is of different design. Unlike most later twin-stick games, the right stick moves the player's avatar. The 1977 sequel, Boot Hill, uses the same control scheme. Space Dungeon (1981) uses two identical joysticks with the now-standard convention of the left for movement and the right for shooting. Mars, a scrolling shooter released in 1981, is also controlled via two 8-way joysticks. The 1981 SNK coin-op Vanguard uses a joystick for movement, but four separate buttons, arranged in a diamond, for firing.

The 1982 arcade game Robotron: 2084 introduced twin-stick controls to a wide audience.  As gamepads with dual thumbsticks did not exist on 8-bit or 16-bit home computers and consoles, home ports of Robotron: 2084 were often awkward to play. The twin-joystick arcade games Rescue and Black Widow were released the same year. Twin-stick controls remained uncommon for arcade games, but were later used in Smash T.V. (1990) and Total Carnage (1992).

Geometry Wars: Retro Evolved, an early hit for the Xbox 360, caused a resurgence in 2005. By 2008 the popularity of the genre waned, following a glut of twin-stick shooters with abstract graphics from indie developers who found the simplicity of the genre appealling. Twin-stick shooter spin-offs of existing video game franchises have since been made, including Halo: Spartan Assault.

References 

 
Video game genres